A. brevirostris may refer to:
 Amazilia brevirostris, the white-chested emerald, a hummingbird species found in eastern Venezuela, the Guianas, Trinidad and far northern Brazil
 Anoiapithecus brevirostris,  an extinct ape species that lived during the Miocene

See also